Jean-Gabriel Asfar (16 November 1917 – 19 October 2010) was an Egyptian fencer. He competed in the individual and team épée events at the 1948 Summer Olympics.

References

External links
 

1917 births
2010 deaths
Egyptian male épée fencers
Olympic fencers of Egypt
Fencers at the 1948 Summer Olympics
Sportspeople from Cairo